The Mixed duet technical routine competition at the 2022 World Aquatics Championships will be held on 18 and 20 June 2022.

Results
The preliminary round was started on 18 June at 13:00. The final was held on 20 June at 14:00.

Green denotes finalists

References

Mixed duet technical routine